Rumangabo is military base of the military of the Democratic Republic of the Congo located in Rutshuru Territory, north of Goma in Nord Kivu province,  north of the headquarters of Virunga National Park.

During Mobutu Sese Seko's presidency, the strategic base of Rumangabo was occupied by the 411th battalion of the 41st Bde Cdo. The Rumangabo-based unit was among the Zairian troops that, in 1984, went to defend the Aouzou Strip in Chad against Ghadaffi's troops. The battalion plunder the city in December 1992.

References

North Kivu
Military of the Democratic Republic of the Congo